Daniel Schumann (born February 13, 1977) is a German former professional footballer who played as a defender.

References

Honours
 Bundesliga runner-up: 1997

1977 births
Living people
Sportspeople from Weimar
People from Bezirk Erfurt
Association football defenders
German footballers
Footballers from Thuringia
Germany under-21 international footballers
Bundesliga players
Bayer 04 Leverkusen players
Bayer 04 Leverkusen II players
SC Freiburg players
Kickers Offenbach players
FSV Frankfurt players